"5-10-15-20 (25-30 Years of Love)" is a 1970 song by The Presidents. It is the title track and first release from their album. The song was produced by Van McCoy. It reached number 11 on the US Billboard Hot 100 and number 5 on the R&B chart. The song was nominated for a Grammy Award for Best R&B Performance by a Duo or Group with Vocals.

Chart performance

Weekly charts

Year-end charts

References

External links
 Lyrics of this song
 

1970 songs
1970 debut singles
Sussex Records singles
Contemporary R&B ballads
Soul ballads
Rhythm and blues ballads
1970s ballads
American soul songs